Isaiah Deion Crawley (born August 19, 1998) is an American professional basketball player for Budapest Honvéd of the Nemzeti Bajnokság I/A, the top division in Hungary. He played college basketball for Columbia State Community College and Georgia Southern.

Early life and high school career
Crawley attended Ripley High School. He averaged 21.5 points and 14.5 rebounds per game as a senior and led the team to a 26–8 record. He received All-State, All-District 15 Class regular season and All-Tournament honors, while also being named the 15-AA Tournament Most Valuable Player. Crawley scored 1,500 points in high school. He signed with Columbia State Community College because he liked the academics.

College career
As a freshman at Columbia State Community College, Crawley averaged 14.4 points and 7.8 rebounds per game, earning Second Team All-NJCAA honors. He posted 17.7 points and 8.6 rebounds per game as a sophomore. Crawley was named to the First Team All-NJCAA. Following the season, he transferred to Georgia Southern. Crawley averaged 11.6 points and 5.5 rebounds per game as a junior, shooting 63.5 percent from the field. On November 11, 2019, he scored a career-high 31 points and had five assists in a 80–77 loss to North Florida. Crawley suffered an injury in a loss to North Dakota on November 30 and missed two games. He scored 24 points and grabbed 10 rebounds on January 16, 2020, in a 82–66 victory over Troy. As a senior, Crawley averaged 13.2 points, 6.7 rebounds, and 1.9 assists per game, shooting 61.8 percent from the floor. He was selected to the Dark Horse Dunker Competition.

Professional career
On August 29, 2020, Crawley signed his first professional contract with Tigers Tübingen of the ProA.

References

External links
Georgia Southern Eagles bio
Tigers Tubingen bio

1998 births
Living people
American men's basketball players
American expatriate basketball people in Germany
Basketball players from Tennessee
Georgia Southern Eagles men's basketball players
Junior college men's basketball players in the United States
People from Ripley, Tennessee
Small forwards
Tigers Tübingen players